Dioptis obliquaria is a moth of the family Notodontidae first described by William Warren in 1905. It is found in southeastern Peru.

References

Moths described in 1905
Notodontidae of South America